Henry Augustus Middleton Smith (April 30, 1853 – November 23, 1924) was a United States district judge of the United States District Court for the District of South Carolina, the United States District Court for the Eastern District of South Carolina and the United States District Court for the Western District of South Carolina.

Education and career

Born in Charleston, South Carolina, Smith received a Bachelor of Arts degree from the College of Charleston in 1872 and read law to enter the bar in 1874. He was in private practice in Charleston from 1877 to 1911.

Federal judicial service

Smith was nominated by President William Howard Taft on May 25, 1911, to a seat on the United States District Court for the District of South Carolina vacated by Judge William H. Brawley. He was confirmed by the United States Senate on June 7, 1911, and received his commission the same day. Smith was reassigned by operation of law to the United States District Court for the Eastern District of South Carolina and the United States District Court for the Western District of South Carolina on January 1, 1912, to a new joint seat authorized by 36 Stat. 1087. He was reassigned by operation of law to serve only in the Eastern District on March 3, 1915. He assumed senior status on November 23, 1923. His service terminated on November 23, 1924, due to his death.

See also 
Edmondston-Alston House

References

Sources

External links
 
 H. A. M. Smith bio from U. of S. Carolina Law School

|-

1853 births
1924 deaths
Judges of the United States District Court for the District of South Carolina
Judges of the United States District Court for the Western District of South Carolina
Judges of the United States District Court for the Eastern District of South Carolina
United States district court judges appointed by William Howard Taft
20th-century American judges
United States federal judges admitted to the practice of law by reading law
People from Charleston, South Carolina